Henry Frederick Niedringhaus (December 15, 1864 – August 3, 1941) was a U.S. Representative from Missouri's 10th congressional district. He was a nephew of Frederick Gottlieb Niedringhaus.

Born in St. Louis, Missouri to German immigrants, Niedringhaus attended the public schools, Central Wesleyan College, Warrenton, Missouri, and Smith Academy, a branch of Washington University in St. Louis.
He engaged in manufacturing pursuits, serving as general manager of the National Enameling & 
Stamping Co. in Granite City, Illinois.
He served as chairman of the board of governors of Shriners' Hospital for Crippled Children, St. Louis, Missouri from 1924 to 1941.

Niedringhaus was elected as a Republican to the Seventieth, Seventy-first, and Seventy-second Congresses (March 4, 1927 – March 3, 1933).
He was an unsuccessful candidate for reelection in 1932 to the Seventy-third Congress.
He retired from active business pursuits and resided in St. Louis, Missouri, until his death on August 3, 1941. He was interred in Bellefontaine Cemetery.

References

1864 births
1941 deaths
20th-century American politicians
American manufacturing businesspeople
American people of German descent
Burials at Bellefontaine Cemetery
Businesspeople from St. Louis
Politicians from St. Louis
Central Wesleyan College (Missouri) alumni
Smith Academy (Missouri) alumni
Republican Party members of the United States House of Representatives from Missouri